Cut from Stone is the fourth studio album by the Norwegian thrash metal band Susperia. As with their other albums, there is an extreme Testament influence in their music.

Track listing

Credits 
Susperia
Athera – vocals
Cyrus – lead guitar
Elvorn (Christian Hagen) – rhythm guitar
Memnock – bass
Tjodalv – drums

Production
Rune Tyvold – cover art

Release history

References 

2007 albums
Susperia albums